Trachelas is a genus of araneomorph spiders originally placed with the Trachelidae, and later moved to the Corinnidae.

Though the name was first used in an identification key published by Ludwig Carl Christian Koch in 1866, it did not include a description for either genders. In 1872, O. Pickard-Cambridge described the type species, ascribing it to the same name given several years earlier. Koch revisited the genus and covered it more thoroughly shortly after the type species was described.

Species
 it contains eighty-eight species:

T. alticola Hu, 2001 – China
T. anomalus (Taczanowski, 1874) – French Guiana
T. barroanus Chamberlin, 1925 – Panama
T. bicolor Keyserling, 1887 – Hispaniola
T. bispinosus F. O. Pickard-Cambridge, 1899 – Mexico to Panama, Trinidad
T. borinquensis Gertsch, 1942 – Puerto Rico
T. brachialis Jin, Yin & Zhang, 2017 – China
T. bravidus Chickering, 1972 – Jamaica
T. bulbosus F. O. Pickard-Cambridge, 1899 – Mexico to El Salvador
T. cadulus Chickering, 1972 – Jamaica
T. cambridgei Kraus, 1955 – El Salvador to Panama
T. canariensis Wunderlich, 1987 – Spain, Canary Is., Africa
T. chamoli Quasin, Siliwal & Uniyal, 2018 – India
T. chubbi Lessert, 1921 – East Africa
T. contractus Platnick & Shadab, 1974 – Cuba
T. costatus O. Pickard-Cambridge, 1885 – Pakistan, India
T. crassus Rivera-Quiroz & Álvarez-Padilla, 2015 – Mexico
T. daubei Schmidt, 1971 – Ecuador
T. depressus Platnick & Shadab, 1974 – Mexico
T. devi Biswas & Raychaudhuri, 2000 – Bangladesh
T. digitus Platnick & Shadab, 1974 – Costa Rica
T. dilatus Platnick & Shadab, 1974 – Hispaniola
T. ductonuda Rivera-Quiroz & Álvarez-Padilla, 2015 – Mexico
T. ecudobus Chickering, 1972 – Panama, Trinidad
T. erectus Platnick & Shadab, 1974 – Hispaniola
T. fanjingshan Zhang, Fu & Zhu, 2009 – China
T. fasciae Zhang, Fu & Zhu, 2009 – China
T. femoralis Simon, 1898 – St. Vincent
T. fuscus Platnick & Shadab, 1974 – Mexico
T. gaoligongensis Jin, Yin & Zhang, 2017 – China
T. giganteus Platnick & Shadab, 1974 – Jamaica
T. gigapophysis Jin, Yin & Zhang, 2017 – China
T. hamatus Platnick & Shadab, 1974 – Mexico
T. hassleri Gertsch, 1942 – Guyana
T. himalayensis Biswas, 1993 – India
T. huachucanus Gertsch, 1942 – Arizona, New Mexico, Mexico
T. inclinatus Platnick & Shadab, 1974 – Cuba
T. jamaicensis Gertsch, 1942 – Jamaica
T. japonicus Bösenberg & Strand, 1906 – Russia (Far East), China, Korea, Japan
T. lanceolatus F. O. Pickard-Cambridge, 1899 – Mexico
T. latus Platnick & Shadab, 1974 – Mexico, Guatemala
T. mexicanus Banks, 1898 – Utah and Colorado, south to Mexico
T. minor O. Pickard-Cambridge, 1872 (type) – Mediterranean to Central Asia, West Africa
T. mombachensis Leister & Miller, 2015 – Nicaragua
T. mulcetus Chickering, 1972 – Jamaica
T. nanyueensis Yin, 2012 – China
T. niger Mello-Leitão, 1922 – Brazil
T. nigrifemur Mello-Leitão, 1941 – Colombia
T. oculus Platnick & Shadab, 1974 – Cuba
T. odoreus Rivera-Quiroz & Álvarez-Padilla, 2015 – Mexico
T. oreophilus Simon, 1906 – India, Sri Lanka
T. organatus Platnick & Shadab, 1974 – Arizona, Sonora, Baja California, Mexico
T. pacificus Chamberlin & Ivie, 1935 – California, Nevada, Mexico
T. panamanus Chickering, 1937 – Panama
T. parallelus Platnick & Shadab, 1974 – Nicaragua
T. planus Platnick & Shadab, 1974 – Costa Rica
T. prominens Platnick & Shadab, 1974 – Mexico to Panama
T. punctatus Simon, 1886 – Senegal
T. pusillus Lessert, 1923 – South Africa, Lesotho
T. quadridens Kraus, 1955 – El Salvador, Costa Rica
T. quisquiliarum Simon, 1906 – Sri Lanka
T. robustus Keyserling, 1891 – Brazil
T. rotundus Platnick & Shadab, 1974 – Mexico
T. rugosus Keyserling, 1891 – Brazil
T. santaemartae Schmidt, 1971 – Colombia
T. scopulifer Simon, 1896 – South Africa
T. shilinensis Jin, Yin & Zhang, 2017 – China
T. similis F. O. Pickard-Cambridge, 1899 – Southeastern United States to Costa Rica
T. sinensis Chen, Peng & Zhao, 1995 – China
T. sinuosus Platnick & Shadab, 1974 – Southern Georgia and Florida
T. speciosus Banks, 1898 – Mexico
T. spicus Platnick & Shadab, 1974 – Mexico
T. spinulatus F. O. Pickard-Cambridge, 1899 – Central America
T. spirifer F. O. Pickard-Cambridge, 1899 – Guatemala, Honduras
T. submissus Gertsch, 1942 – Paraguay
T. sylvae Caporiacco, 1949 – Kenya
T. tanasevitchi Marusik & Kovblyuk, 2010 – Russia (Far East)
T. tomaculus Platnick & Shadab, 1974 – Cuba, Hispaniola
T. tranquillus (Hentz, 1847) – Midwest to Eastern United States, Canada
T. transversus F. O. Pickard-Cambridge, 1899 – Mexico, Costa Rica
T. triangulus Platnick & Shadab, 1974 – Panama
T. tridentatus Mello-Leitão, 1947 – Brazil
T. trifidus Platnick & Shadab, 1974 – Panama
T. truncatulus F. O. Pickard-Cambridge, 1899 – Mexico
T. uniaculeatus Schmidt, 1956 – Canary Is.
T. vitiosus Keyserling, 1891 – Brazil
T. volutus Gertsch, 1935 – Southeastern United States, Mexico
T. vulcani Simon, 1896 – China, Japan, Indonesia (Java, Moluccas)

References

External links
Trachelas at BugGuide

Araneomorphae genera
Trachelidae